Mackworth is an electoral ward in the city of Derby, England.  The ward contains 23 listed buildings that are recorded in the National Heritage List for England.  All the listed buildings are designated at Grade II, the lowest of the three grades, which is applied to "buildings of national importance and special interest".  The ward is to the northwest of the centre of the city and is almost entirely residential.  Most of the listed buildings are houses, and the others consist of the entrance screen to a former gaol, a former toll house, a public house, two schools, one active and the other used for different purposes, a set of railings, and former almshouses.
  

Buildings

References

Citations

Sources

 

Lists of listed buildings in Derbyshire
Listed buildings in Derby